Thaumaglossa pici, is a species of skin beetle found in Sri Lanka.

Description
Total length of female is about 2.70 to 2.80 mm. Cuticle black and dark brown dorsally and black ventrally. Body oval. Head finely punctuate with long erect white-grey pubescence. Palpi yellow. Eyes are very large. Antennae with 11 segments and dark-brown. Pronotum finely punctuate with long recumbent white-grey pubescence and a medial black spot. Scutellum triangular. Elytra black, with dark-brown apex. Epipleuron black, with white pubescence. Femora dark-brown, and tibiae brown with short white setae. In each elytron there are, one humeral, pre-scutellar, median and apical spots.

References 

Dermestidae
Insects of Sri Lanka
Insects described in 2008